István Balogh may refer to:

István Balogh (footballer) (1912–1992),  Hungarian footballer
István Balogh (politician) (1894–1976), Hungarian dissident and priest
István Balogh (director), Hungarian film director during the 1940s